Aarón Martín Caricol (born 22 April 1997) is a Spanish professional footballer who plays as a left-back for German club 1. FSV Mainz 05.

Club career

Espanyol
Born in Montmeló, Barcelona, Catalonia, Martín joined RCD Espanyol's youth setup in 2005. On 29 March 2015, while still a junior, he made his senior debut with the reserves by starting in a 1–0 Segunda División B away loss against Gimnàstic de Tarragona.

Martín scored his first senior goal on 16 January 2016, the first in a 2–0 home win over CF Reus Deportiu. On 13 June, already being a starter, he renewed his contract until 2020.

On 2 October 2016, Martín made his first-team – and La Liga – debut, coming on as a second half substitute for Diego Reyes in a 0–0 home draw against Villarreal CF. The following 28 January he agreed to an extension until 2022, being definitely promoted to the first team three days later.

Mainz 05
On 6 August 2018, Martín joined 1. FSV Mainz 05 on a season-long loan. His first appearance in the Bundesliga took place on 26 August, in a 1–0 home defeat of VfB Stuttgart where he featured the full 90 minutes.

Martín signed a permanent contract on 5 November 2018, effective as of the following 1 July. On 31 December 2020, he was loaned to RC Celta de Vigo for the remainder of the campaign with an option to buy. 

Martín scored his first goal as a professional on 18 February 2022, helping the hosts to beat Bayer 04 Leverkusen 3–2.

International career
On 28 December 2016, Martín made his debut for the Catalonia national team, starting in a 3–3 draw against Tunisia (4–2 loss on penalties).

Career statistics

Club

Honours
Spain U21
UEFA European Under-21 Championship: 2019

References

External links

1997 births
Living people
People from Vallès Oriental
Sportspeople from the Province of Barcelona
Spanish footballers
Footballers from Catalonia
Association football defenders
La Liga players
Segunda División B players
RCD Espanyol B footballers
RCD Espanyol footballers
RC Celta de Vigo players
Bundesliga players
1. FSV Mainz 05 players
Spain youth international footballers
Spain under-21 international footballers
Catalonia international footballers
Spanish expatriate footballers
Expatriate footballers in Germany
Spanish expatriate sportspeople in Germany